Said Kola (also Romanized as Sa‘īd Kolā) is a village in Pazevar Rural District, Rudbast District, Babolsar County, Mazandaran Province, Iran. As of the 2006 census, its population was 609, with there being 158 families.

References 

Populated places in Babolsar County